Matthew W. Claman (born 1959) is an American politician and attorney serving as a member of the Alaska House of Representatives. Claman previously served as the acting Mayor of Anchorage after Mark Begich resigned from the position to serve in the United States Senate.

Early life and education 
Claman was raised in Dallas, Texas. He earned a Bachelor of Arts degree in history from Colorado College. Claman moved to Alaska in 1980, working as a prep cook at a mining camp. Claman returned to Texas to earn Juris Doctor from the University of Texas School of Law. He then returned to Alaska and began to practice law.

Career 
Claman is a trial and appellate attorney with Lane Powell, a regional law firm, and is past President of the Alaska Bar Association.

Claman served on the Anchorage Assembly beginning in 2007 and became its chair in 2008. He became the Acting Mayor of Anchorage in 2009 when then-Mayor Mark Begich was elected Alaska's United States Senator in the 2008 general election. As Acting Mayor during 2008 financial crisis, he led efforts to reduce the municipal budget by $20 million, approximately 5%, and negotiated concessions to achieve a balanced budget.

Claman was elected to the Alaska House of Representatives in 2014, and joined the Democratic minority. During his first term, he sat on the Judiciary Committee, the Transportation Committee, and the Energy Committee. He is a strong advocate for a responsible action plan to address Alaska's financial challenges.

In 2016, Claman was re-elected to the State House. Following the election, he joined the Alaska House Majority Coalition of 22 Democrats, Republicans, and Independents who are committed to working together to put Alaska first. His peers selected him to chair the House Judiciary Committee, where he previously served as a committee member. He is also the Vice Chair of the Rules Committee and a member of the Legislative Council, Energy Committee, Transportation Committee, and Criminal Justice Commission. Claman has introduced legislation for a statewide vote to amend the Constitution of Alaska and limit the session to 90 days.

Personal life 
Claman is married to Lisa Rieger, who works for Cook Inlet Tribal Council, one of Alaska's most successful non-profit corporations. Matt and Lisa have two adult children. Claman is a licensed Emergency Medical Technician (EMT) and professional wilderness guide.

References

1959 births
Alaska lawyers
Anchorage Assembly members
Colorado College alumni
Date of birth missing (living people)
Living people
Mayors of Anchorage, Alaska
Democratic Party members of the Alaska House of Representatives
Place of birth missing (living people)
University of Texas School of Law alumni
21st-century American politicians